Seyf ol Din-e Olya (also Romanized as Seyf ol Dīn-e ‘Olyā and Seyf od Dīn-e ‘Olyā) is a village in Akhtachi Rural District, in the Central District of Bukan County, West Azerbaijan Province, Iran. At the 2006 census, its population was 170, in 25 families.

References 

Populated places in Bukan County